Meldrum House is a Category B listed country house and estate in Oldmeldrum, Aberdeenshire, Scotland. It dates to around 1625 (although its datestone is not in its original position), and it received its historic designation in 1971.

History
The nucleus of the house is the original part completed in 1625. In the 17th and 18th centuries the house was the seat of the Urquhart family. In the mid 18th century, the local laird, William Urquhart, who was the 4th Urquhat of Meldrum and 17th Chief of the Clan Urquhart, commissioned Oldmeldrum Town Hall. Alterations were made to the surrounding structure of Meldrum House in the 18th and 19th centuries. Archibald Simpson reconstructed it as a symmetrical neo-Jacobean three-storey mansion in the late 1830s. W. L. Duncan further reconstructed it a century later at the request of then-owner Lady Doris Duff.

The house is said to be haunted by a "White Lady". Early on the morning of Christmas Day 1617, while the laird of Meldrum was away hunting with his hawks, his servant John Gordon abducted Marjorie Gordon, daughter of Grisel Stewart, Lady Meldrum, from the house.

Today, the estate is a hotel and golf course.

The house's outer gate, stable and coachhouse block, dated 1628, is Category A listed.

Gallery

See also
List of listed buildings in Aberdeenshire

References

External links

Category B listed buildings in Aberdeenshire
Buildings and structures in Aberdeenshire
Country houses in Aberdeenshire
Reportedly haunted locations in Scotland